Foel Fenlli or Moel Fenlli is a hill in Denbighshire, North Wales.

A popular ascent leads south from the car park at Bwlch Penbarras, which is also a popular starting point for ascending Moel Famau to the north. The Offa's Dyke Path runs around the western slopes. The remains of a hillfort roughly ten hectares in area are found on the peak; the site is believed to date back to the Iron Age but was later reoccupied during the Dark Ages. The "iniquitous and tyrannical" king Benlli (after whom the mountain was named) probably lived there c. 450. He was admonished for opposing Saint Germanus, and he and his castle were "consumed by fire from heaven", so the legend goes. There are the remains of strong ramparts on all sides, with an entrance at the west end. In the south-west quarter of the fort enclosure are about two dozen hut platforms; there is a spring close to the centre.

See also
List of hillforts in Wales

References

External links
www.geograph.co.uk : photos of Foel Fenlli and surrounding area

Hillforts in Denbighshire
Mountains and hills of Denbighshire
Marilyns of Wales